This article displays the qualifying draw of the 2011 Brasil Open.

Players

Seeds

Qualifiers

Qualifying draw

First qualifier

Second qualifier

Third qualifier

Fourth qualifier

References
 Qualifying Draw

Brasil Open - qualifying
2011 Brasil Open